The Commissioner of Police, Delhi or Delhi Police Commissioner is the head of the Delhi Police, the Law enforcement agency of the 15 police districts (as of January 2019) of National Capital of India, Delhi.

Origins
In the year 1966, the Government of India constituted the Delhi Police Commission headed by Justice G.D. Khosla to go into the problems faced by Delhi Police and it was on the basis of the Khosla Commission Report that the Delhi Police was reorganised. Four Police districts, namely, North, Central, South and New Delhi were constituted. The Delhi Police Commission also recommended the introduction of Police Commissioner system which was eventually adopted from 1 July 1978.

Following the recommendations of "Khosla Commission", Commissioner of Police system in Delhi, the capital of India was started in 1978, with J.N. Chaturvedi being appointed as the first Police Commissioner of Delhi. It replaced the earlier Inspector General of Police system, where the Inspector General of police would report to the Divisional Commissioner (India) of Delhi, thus having a dual authority in effect. The Commissioner system brought an end to this dual authority as since then the appointed Commissioner of Police is of Director General of Police (DGP) reports to the Chief Secretary.

The longest serving Commissioner of Delhi Police is Krishan Kant Paul who served for 42 months (2004-2007).

Incumbent Police Commissioner
The present Commissioner of Delhi Police is Sanjay Arora, IPS a 1988 batch officer of Tamil Nadu cadre deputed to AGMUT (Arunachal Pradesh-Goa-Mizoram and Union Territory) cadre, who took office on 1 August 2022.

Former Police Commissioners

Controversies
 The issue of appointment of police commissioners of New Delhi, has not been without controversies. The most recent controversy was when a senior police officer Kiran Bedi was superseded to appoint her junior Dadwal as the Police Commissioner in July 2007. Bedi went on record saying that at a time, when the President of India as well as the chairperson of the ruling alliance UPA were women (Pratibha Patil and Sonia Gandhi respectively), it would have done a lot of good for country's image as well as for the upliftment of women if she had been appointed. She resigned soon after in protest, although her official line was that she wanted to devote more time to social work.

 Various opposition parties questioned the appointment of Rakesh Asthana, a 1984-Gujarat cadre IPS officer, as the Commissioner, who was appointed to the post on 27 July 2021, just before 4 days of his superannuation.

See also
 Police Commissioner of Mumbai
 Police Commissioner of Kolkata

References 

New Delhi
 
Indian police chiefs
Delhi Police
Commissioners of Delhi Police